Hana Malhas is a Jordanian singer-songwriter and musician. In 2013, Malhas launched a monthly concert series called "Bala Feesh" (Arabic for "unplugged") inviting alternative Arab musicians to perform. Malhas released her first EP Shapeshift in 2010, and her second EP 'Hana Malhas & the Overthinkers' in 2012, both consisting of songs in the English language. Her track Nasi, an Arabic single she released as part of her first full-length album of the same name in 2018, was featured in Universal Records’ MENA compilation "Now: Best of Indie Arabia Volume II."

References 

Living people
Jordanian women singers
21st-century women singers
Year of birth missing (living people)